Butonese can refer to:
 Butonese people from Buton, Southeast Sulawesi, Indonesia.
 Butonese languages, a group of languages spoken by both Muna people and Butonese people
 Butonese language, also known as Wolio language.